Flight from Ashiya (aka Ashiya Kara no hiko) is a 1964 film about the U.S. Air Force's Air Rescue Service, flying from Ashiya Air Base, Japan.  In this fictionalized American-Japanese co-production film set in the early 1960s, a flight crew's mission is to rescue a liferaft of Japanese civilians stranded in rough seas. The film was based on the 1956 novel Rescue! by Elliott Arnold (repressed as Flight from Ashiya in 1959). It was released in Japan as Ashiya Kara no hiko.

Plot
MSgt Mike Takashima (Yul Brynner), Col Glenn Stevenson (Richard Widmark) and 1st Lt John Gregg (George Chakiris), all members of the U. S. Air Force Air Rescue Service at Ashiya Air Base, Japan, set out to rescue the survivors of a Japanese ship wrecked in a still-raging storm. As they fly to the site of the wreck, each man recalls a part of his past: Gregg remembers the avalanche caused in Europe when his Sikorsky H-19 Chickasaw helicopter came too close to a mountain. The avalanche subsequently buried alive the group of people whom he was attempting to rescue.

The accident has since caused him to fear flying solo. Stevenson, deeply prejudiced against the Japanese, recalls the reason for his hatred: as a civilian pilot in the Philippines prior to World War II, he met and married Caroline Gordon (Shirley Knight). She and their infant son later died in a Japanese prison camp when they were refused medical supplies which were being saved for Japanese soldiers. Takashima, half-Polish (mother), half-Japanese (father), reminisces about his tragic love affair with Leila (Danièle Gaubert), an Algerian girl, when he was an Army paratrooper during World War II. He was unable to stop a bridge from being blown up, a bridge where Leila had run to look for him after learning that his unit was being withdrawn from town.

Stevenson, Gregg and Takashima are the crew of the lead aircraft of a flight of two Grumman HU-16 Albatross seaplanes dispatched to rescue the Japanese civilians at sea. When one HU-16 crashes in the rough seas, Stevenson refuses to jeopardize his aircraft for Japanese lives. At the last minute, however, he recalls Caroline's dying plea not to hate; he overcomes his prejudice.

Takashima volunteered to parachute to the life rafts with rescue equipment. Stevenson and Gregg then land the aircraft at sea and rescue the survivors, but when Stevenson is injured in the landing, Gregg is forced to overcome his fear and handle the dangerous takeoff and the flight back to Ashiya.

Cast

 Yul Brynner as MSgt. Mike Takashima
 Richard Widmark as Lt. Col. Glenn Stevenson
 George Chakiris as 2nd Lt. John Gregg
 Suzy Parker as Lucille Caroll
 Shirley Knight as Caroline Gordon / Stevenson
 Danièle Gaubert as Leila
 Eiko Taki as Tomiko
 Joe Di Reda as SSgt. Randy Smith
 Tom Korzeniowski as Sgt. Garrison
 Mitsuhiro Sugiyama as Charlie
 E.S. Ince as Capt. Walter Mound
 Andrew Hughes as Dr. Horton
 William Ross as Capt. Jerry Cooper
 June Shelley (credited as June Elliott)

Production
Principal photography on Flight from Ashiya began on August 27, 1962, with a 12-week shooting schedule. Most of the sequences took place in Japan with air base exteriors filmed at the Tachikawa Air Base, home to the USAF 39th Air Rescue Squadron. Two of the squadron's twin–radial engine Grumman HU-16 Albatross amphibious flying boats were supplied to the production.

Reception
Film reviewer Howard Thompson in writing in The New York Times, was scathing in his review of Flight From Ashiya: "Occasionally, it's diverting to see just how consistently bad a picture can be. Anyone interested should catch 'Flight From Ashiya', which opened yesterday at the Palace and other Premiere Showcase theaters."

Aviation film historian Stephen Pendo, in Aviation in the Cinema (1985) had a similar reaction; Flight from Ashiya was "dull" and ruined by "too many flashbacks."

See also
 List of American films of 1964
 "Flight From Ashiya" was also the name of the debut single by the British psychedelic band Kaleidoscope, released in September 1967.

References

Notes

Citations

Bibliography

 Beck, Simon D. The Aircraft-Spotter's Film and Television Companion. Jefferson, North Carolina: McFarland & Company, 2016. .
 Orriss, Bruce. When Hollywood Ruled the Skies: The Post World War II Years. Hawthorne, California: Aero Associates Inc., 2018. .
 Paris, Michael. From the Wright Brothers to Top Gun: Aviation, Nationalism, and Popular Cinema. Manchester, UK: Manchester University Press, 1995. .
 Pendo, Stephen. Aviation in the Cinema. Lanham, Maryland: Scarecrow Press, 1985. .

External links
 
 
 
 

1964 films
American World War II films
Japanese World War II films
United Artists films
American aviation films
English-language Japanese films
Films about seafaring accidents or incidents
Films based on American novels
Films directed by Michael Anderson
Films set in the 1960s
Films set in Fukuoka Prefecture
Films set in the Pacific Ocean
Films shot in Tokyo
Films with screenplays by Waldo Salt
Films produced by Harold Hecht
Japan in non-Japanese culture
Films about the United States Air Force
Films about veterans
1960s English-language films
1960s American films
1960s Japanese films